The dii lucrii or dei lucrii are a collective of Roman deities mentioned by the Christian apologist Arnobius (d. 330 AD):
"Indeed, who is there who would believe that there are gods of profit, and that they preside over the pursuit of profits, which come most of the time from base sources and always at the expense of others?" Arnobii disputationum adversus gentes: libri octo 4.9.1:" Qui est enim qui credat esse deos Lucrios et lucrorum consecutionibus praesidere, cum ex turpibus causis frequentissime veniant et aliorum semper ex dispendiis constent?"

See also
 Mercury (mythology)

References

Commerce gods
Roman gods